Ellen Joyce Loo Hoi Tung (27 March 1986 – 5 August 2018) was a Canadian-Hong Kong musician, singer-songwriter and record producer. She was the guitarist, backing vocalist and a co-founder of the folk-pop rock group at17.

Early life
Loo was born in Toronto, Canada, on March 27, 1986. At age 4, she moved to Hong Kong. She learned classical guitar from her father at the age of nine. At age 14, she and her older brother, P. J. Loo, entered the musical competition "Original Music 2000" (原音2000), which was held by Tom Lee Music in Hong Kong. They won third prize in the competition.

Personal life
Loo was diagnosed with bipolar disorder in 2013, and made her first public statement regarding the disorder in April 2015. She came out as a lesbian at the Golden Melody Awards in Taiwan in 2017. She married Taiwanese cinematographer Fisher Yu in 2016. The couple registered their marriage in Canada.

Death
Loo died after falling from her apartment building in Happy Valley, Hong Kong on 5 August 2018, at the age of 32. The case was classified as suicide by police after checking CCTV footage of the building. No suicide note was found.

Publications
Lost. Escape. Rockmuiology – A collection of the photographs she took over 3 years of her life with her Revue 35CC camera prior to the publication, accompanied by a series of writings (in English). 240 pages, published by Youth Culture (青春文化) in July 2006, Hong Kong, .
 I learned the chords at 17, collection of 22 original guitar scores from at17's songs, transcribed by Loo in both standard notation and guitar tablature. 2005, published by People Mountain People Sea / Kubrick, Hong Kong,

References

External links
 at17's official website (in Chinese) 
 http://www.at17.net (in Chinese)
 Bitetone Presents﹣Our 2011 Best 35 Chinese Records 《掀起》
 Bitetone Presents 2012 Best 20 Records From China, Hong Kong and Taiwan 《你安安靜靜地躲起來》

1986 births
2018 deaths
Hong Kong former Christians
Musicians from Toronto
Cantopop singers
Canadian people of Hong Kong descent
21st-century Hong Kong women singers
Hong Kong women singer-songwriters
Hong Kong record producers
Hong Kong rock guitarists
Fingerstyle guitarists
Hong Kong lesbian musicians
Hong Kong LGBT singers
Hong Kong LGBT songwriters
Canadian lesbian musicians
Canadian LGBT singers
Canadian LGBT songwriters
Filmed deaths from falls
Suicides by jumping in Hong Kong
21st-century women guitarists
Lesbian singers
Lesbian songwriters
2018 suicides
Hong Kong idols
LGBT record producers
20th-century Hong Kong LGBT people
21st-century Hong Kong LGBT people
Canadian-born Hong Kong artists